Kateb is a surname, and may refer to;

Kateb derives from كاتب which means scribe in Arabic.

 Kateb Yacine, Algerian writer
 Kateb al Shammary, Saudi Arabian lawyer

 Amazigh Kateb, Algerian singer and musician
 Faiz Mohammad Katib Hazara, also known as Fayż Mohammad Kāteb, Afghan intellectual
 George Kateb, American political writer
 Marjan al-Katib al-Islami, also known as Marjan Kateb Islami,  Iranian calligrapher
 Reda Kateb, French actor

References

Arabic-language surnames
Surnames of Algerian origin